Molly Zero is a novel written in the second person by Keith Roberts published in 1980.

Plot summary
Molly Zero is a novel in which Molly Zero escapes a training school for the ruling class of a Britain set 200 years in the future.

Reception
Dave Langford reviewed Molly Zero for White Dwarf #74, and stated that "Roberts' simple and human story leaves you to decide whether the price of compromise (which includes all Molly's innocence) is too great."

Reviews
Review by Paul Kincaid (1980) in Vector 99
Review by Michael E. Stamm (1984) in Fantasy Review, August 1984

References

1980 British novels
British science fiction novels
Second-person narrative novels
Victor Gollancz Ltd books